The Leader of the Opposition is a title held by the leader of the second-largest party in the New South Wales Legislative Assembly, the lower house of the Parliament of New South Wales. There is also a Leader of the Opposition in the Legislative Council. The leader acts as the public face of the opposition, leading the opposition on the floor of parliament. They act as a chief critic of the government and ultimately attempt to portray the opposition as a feasible alternate government. They are also given certain additional rights under parliamentary standing orders, such as extended time limits for speeches.

The current leader of the opposition is Chris Minns, who was elected on 4 June 2021. Penny Sharpe serves as leader of the opposition in the Legislative Council.

List of leaders of the opposition in New South Wales since 1901

 Political parties

Leaders of the opposition in the Legislative Assembly

Leaders of the opposition in the Legislative Council

Notes

References

See also
Leader of the New South Wales Liberal Party
Leader of the Australian Labor Party in New South Wales
Opposition (Australia)

 
New South Wales
 
 
Opposition